Leaupepe Toleafoa Apulu Faafisi (born 1947) is a Samoan politician. He has served as a Cabinet Minister and as Speaker of the Legislative Assembly of Samoa. He is a member of the Human Rights Protection Party (HRPP).

Faafisi was first elected to the Legislative Assembly of Samoa at the 1991 Samoan general election as a candidate for the Samoan National Development Party. He switched allegiance to the HRPP immediately after the election, and was appointed Deputy Speaker. In 1996 he was appointed Speaker of the Legislative Assembly. In 1998 he was hospitalised while attending the Commonwealth Speakers and Clerks Conference in Port of Spain, Trinidad and Tobago. Following his re-election in 2001 he was appointed to the role for a second term.

He was re-elected at the 2006 election and appointed to Cabinet as Minister of Police. He was not reappointed to Cabinet in 2011. In 2013 he advocated exporting dog meat to China as a measure for controlling stray animals.

In 2016 he was elected Speaker of the Legislative Assembly for a third term. As Speaker he oversaw the redevelopment of the new Parliament building. As Speaker, he was accused of lacking independence, of removing Members' speeches from Hansard, and of taking direction in the House from Prime Minister Tuilaepa Aiono Sailele Malielegaoi. in November 2020 he declared the seats of independent opposition MPs Olo Fiti Vaai and Faumuina Asi Pauli Wayne Fong vacant after they announced they would be standing as candidates for the F.A.S.T. party at the 2021 election. On 14 December 2020 the decision was declared unlawful and invalid by the Supreme Court of Samoa.

Faafisi retired at the April 2021 election. He was succeeded as MP in his electorate (now renamed Aana Alofi No. 2) by his son, Aiono Afaese Toleafoa.

On 23 May 2021 during the 2021 Samoan constitutional crisis Faafisi purported to cancel the first meeting of the new legislative assembly, in violation of an order from the Supreme Court.

References

|-

|-

|-

Living people
Speakers of the Legislative Assembly of Samoa
Members of the Legislative Assembly of Samoa
Human Rights Protection Party politicians
Government ministers of Samoa
1947 births